The British Naval Northwest Passage Expedition, also known as Franklin's lost expedition, was an attempt by the British Royal Navy to discover and chart the Northwest Passage through the Canadian Arctic in 1845, under the command of Sir John Franklin and using the ships  and . The following is a complete list of the ships' muster rolls.


Personnel

HMS Erebus 

 ∗ Written with the first "s" as an "ſ" (long s) in Victorian manner i.e.: "Cloẛsan"
 ¤ First name read as "David" in Cyriax crewlist
 † This name appears twice in the original list
 ‡ McClintock spells this as "Birt"
 ∞ Returned to England from the Whalefish Islands on the Barretto Junior

HMS Terror 

 ∗ First name read as "David" in Cyriax crewlist
 † This name is not in the Muster Books but is taken from Cyriax
 ∞ Returned to England from the Whalefish Islands in the Barretto Junior

References 

Arctic-related lists
Franklin's lost expedition